Rafael Zaldívar (1834 – 2 March 1903) was President of El Salvador from 1 May 1876 until 21 June 1885, and later a diplomat.

Zaldívar studied medicine in Europe and began his career as a physician. In 1860 he was appointed to the Chair of Philosophy and Hygiene at the University of Guatemala.  After leaving this post, Zaldívar entered politics and was elected to the House of Representatives, then to the Senate, and finally elected president in 1876.

It was under his administration that liberal reforms abolished the existence of collectively owned ejidos and tierras comunales throughout the country. He also remains a key figure in what later became known as the "Coffee Revolution." It was Rafael Zaldívar who introduced reforms that paved the way for cultivation on large scale. Under the Zaldívar administration, virgin land was turned into farmlands. This was done by allowing for the sale of Indigenous lands. Resistance resulted from Indigenous Salvadorans, but it quelled by the Zaldívar government, mostly by creating and then deploying a rural police force.

President Zaldívar was not in favour of the proposed rebirth of the Unified Central Republic agreed to by his predecessors and decided to withdraw from the Union. He was later overthrown in a military coup and succeeded by General Francisco Menéndez. 
He was appointed as his country's Envoy Extraordnairy and Minister Plenipotentiary to the United Kingdom in early 1900, and later held the same position to France. He died in Paris in 1903 while serving as his country's minister to France.

References

Presidents of El Salvador
1834 births
1903 deaths
People from La Unión Department
19th-century Salvadoran people
Leaders ousted by a coup
Salvadoran physicians
19th-century physicians